Jean Sécember (1911-1990) was a French international footballer. He was born on 10 April 1911 in Tourcoing and died in 1990 at the age of 79.

He won four international caps between 1932 and 1935, the first three while he was at the amateur club US Tourquennoise. In 1933 he moved to Excelsior and won his final cap in 1935 against Germany. In June 1932, he scored four goals in a 5–3 win over Bulgaria.

References 

1911 births
1990 deaths
Sportspeople from Tourcoing
French footballers
France international footballers
Association football forwards
Ligue 1 players
Sportspeople from Nord (French department)
Excelsior AC (France) players
US Tourcoing FC players